The Nationalist Left of the Balearic Islands Federation (FENIB), also known as Nationalist Left Federation, was formed in 1989 by the Socialist Party of Majorca, Socialist Party of Menorca and Entesa Nacionalista i Ecologista. In 1998 it was transformed into the PSM–Nationalist Agreement party federation.

References

Political parties in the Balearic Islands
Political parties established in 1989
1989 establishments in Spain